The Shire of Ballan was a local government area about  west of Melbourne, the state capital of Victoria, Australia.

History

Ballan was first incorporated as a road district on 14 October 1862, and became a shire on 2 November 1864. On 9 October 1921, parts of the shire were annexed to the Shire of Kyneton.

On 15 December 1994, the Shire of Ballan was abolished, and along with the Shire of Bacchus Marsh, was merged into the Shire of Moorabool, which was created earlier in May 1994 after the merger of the Shire of Bungaree and parts of the Shire of Buninyong.

Wards

The Shire of Ballan was divided into four ridings, each of which elected three councillors:
 East Riding
 Central Riding
 West Riding
 South Riding

Towns and localities
 Ballan*
 Blackwood
 Blakeville
 Bunding
 Fiskville
 Gordon
 Greendale
 Ingliston
 Morrisons
 Mount Egerton
 Mount Wallace

* Council seat.

Population

* Estimate in 1958 Victorian Year Book.

References

External links
 Victorian Places - Ballan Shire

Ballan